John Phelps was a Clerk and Registrar of the Committee for Plundered Ministers and of the High Court which tried Charles I of England for high treason in 1649.

Early life

Not much is known about John Phelps' early life. He was born in about 1619 in Salisbury, Wiltshire, England. He matriculated at Corpus Christi College, Oxford, on 20 May 1636, describing himself as age 17, and the son of Robert Phelps of Salisbury. On 1 January 1648-9 he was appointed clerk-assistant to Henry Elsing, clerk of the House of Commons.

Says Harper's Pictorial History of England, edition of 1849, pp 111–377, "The name was anciently spelled 'Phyllypes,' but has always been pronounced 'Phelps.' After the time of Edward IV, the superfluous letters were dropped.

Phelps' opposition to the High Church and Charles I

This family opposed the High Church, the Prerogative Party of Stafford, and Bishop Laud. They felt the British church and government under Charles I was becoming insufferably hieratic, tyrannical, and tax-hungry. Common resentment among the English people led soon to the English Revolution beginning in 1642. Agents intercepted his secret invitations to foreign kings and armies, that they invade England, crush Parliament and the English Constitution, massacre his English opponents, and restore Charles to his pretended Dei gratia royal privileges. This eventually led to the beheading of King Charles for treason in 1649. Those who opposed him felt that Charles Stuart incorrigibly continued to hold his dynastic interest separate and above those of Parliament and the British people, and ultimately Parliament had no alternative but to end his conspiracies, par coup de hache ("by blow of axe").

Phelps role in the trial of Charles I

In 1648-49, John Phelps was called by England's Rump Parliament to serve as Clerk of High Court at the trial of King Charles I.
He became private secretary to Oliver Cromwell, and in the illustration at right of the trial of Charles I, is illustrated sitting on the right of the table in the center of the room. "Extracts from a True Copy of the Journal of the High Court Of Justice for the Tryal of K. Charles I:" "And in order to the more regular and due proceedings of the said Court, they nominate officers, and accordingly chose Mr. Aske, Dr. Dorislaus, Mr. Steel and Mr. Cooke, counsel, to attend the said Court. Mr. Greaves and Mr. John Phelpes, clerks, to whom notice thereof was ordered to be given." (page 7)

"Mr. Andrew Broughton attended according to former order, and it was thereupon again Ordered, That Andrew Broughton and John Phelpes be, and they are hereby constituted clerks of the said Court, and injoyned [sic] to give their attendance from time to time accordingly." (page 12)

During the trial, "on the Tuesday afternoon in Westminster Hall, the King again refused to recognise the jurisdiction of the Court;" John Phelps as the Clerk "formally demanded his answer, [the King] refused, and default was recorded." Under English law at the time, a refusal to enter a plea was entered as a guilty plea.

Reputation and government service after the trial

In Clarendon's correspondence with the Lord President, 1685-6, Wealsman, "John Phelps of Vevey, ill reputation and sheriff thereof." Answer: "Mr. Phelps is so far from being of ill reputation that there is not any man in the county, nor in the army, under a better character. He is son of a loyal gentleman, Col. Edward Phelps, and brother of Sir Edward Phelps of Somerset."

John Phelps was a prominent man in the party to which he had attached himself. He was clerk and registrar of the Committee for Plundered Ministers, and had chambers in the Old Palace in which the committee sat. On 14 October 1652, he was appointed clerk to the committee of Parliament which had been named to confer with deputies from Scotland. He was to be allowed a clerk assistant, and it was ordered that a request be made to the first-named committee to dispense with his attendance in the meantime.

John Phelps was given instructions for "matting the room in which they were to meet, and for fitting it up so that it might be very warm. At a later period Henry Scobell, clerk of Parliament, was required to deliver to John Phelps all papers and books returned from Scotland touching delinquents and sequestrations."

A petition having been presented to the Council of State by John, Earl of Crawford, order was made 1 September 1653, that Mr Phelps examine his books as to what was done by the Commissioners who had then lately been sent into Scotland as to whether any order was given by them for allowing the Earl's wife the fifth part of his estate for maintenance of herself and children. Shortly afterwards, 8 October, in the same year, three persons, of whom Mr Phelps was one, were appointed to sort the Scotch records in the Tower of London, to report to the council, and in the meantime not to permit any records to go to Scotland but what should be particularly viewed by them.

Purchases Hampton Court

He had purchased the manor and royalty of Hampton Court on the banks of the River Thames, part of the inheritance of the Crown, with which those who were then in power arrogated to themselves the right to deal. But this property in every way so desirable, was not to remain with John Phelps, for the first among them had set his heart upon it, and his wish must be gratified. The matter was worked out in due form and, by a committee, negotiations were opened with Phelps, the upshot being that an agreement for repurchase at £750 was concluded and the attorney-general was to direct the preparation of such assurances as would settle the property to "His Highness' " use, that is, to the use of Oliver, Lord Protector of the Commonwealth of England. There was no attempt to push the price to an extreme figure, Phelps was too shrewd a mail for anything of that kind seeing that of two valuations, one was higher by £266 than the price he had agreed to accept.

The affair was concluded when, on 8 August 1654, a warrant was directed to the Commissioners of Excise to pay to Phelps the stipulated sum. It appears incidentally that John Phelps was well up in shorthand, which must have helped him more than a little, for he took in that way all the evidence adduced on the trial of three persons for endeavoring to raise forces against the Protector. Not long before the overthrow of his party, an order in Parliament was made on 13 May 1659, that £50 be given to John Phelps for his services as clerk of Parliament, and the money was paid soon afterwards.

Ample evidence has thus been adduced that Phelps was very useful to his party, and was not only willing but able to serve it in important capacities, whilst his continued employment show that, so far, his services were understood. This on the one side, and on the other not a word has been found which suggests that he was unduly recompensed, so that he is not to be numbered amongst the many whom, at the public cost, the Cromwellites rewarded with a lavish and unsparing hand, far beyond anything that was legitimate.

Prosecution after the Restoration

In August 1660, following the Restoration of Charles II, the Act of Indemnity and Oblivion was passed as a gesture of reconciliation to reunite the kingdom. A free pardon was granted to everyone who had supported the Commonwealth and Protectorate, except for those who had directly participated in the trial and execution of King Charles I eleven years previously. In England, a special court was appointed and in October 1660 those regicides who were still alive and living in Britain were brought to trial. Phelps was among those sought for prosecution.

Phelps penalty, should he be arrested, was to be "drawne upon Sledges with Ropes about theire necks:"

Exile after the Restoration

Phelps evaded pursuit and was at Lausanne, Switzerland in the company of Edmund Ludlow, one of the regicides, and fellow clerk Andrew Broughton. Broughton and Phelps were fortunate to live out their lives in exile in Vevey, Switzerland. During the English Restoration, any goods which he still owned in England were confiscated. Phelps died after 1666 and was buried in St Martin's Cathedral, alongside Edmund Ludlow, one of the judges who condemned Charles I, and his fellow clerk Andrew Broughton.

St Martin's Church Memorial

In 1881, President of the United States James A. Garfield named William Walter Phelps minister to Austria-Hungary, but he held this post for only a few months, resigning after Garfield was assassinated. It was apparently while serving in Austria-Hungary that William W. Phelps traveled to Vevey, Switzerland, where he and the Hon. Charles A. Phelps, M.D. of Massachusetts, commissioned a memorial to their ancestor John Phelps.

The top of the monument contains the Phelps coat of arms, described as A Lion Rampant, Gorged with a Plain Collar, and Chained.

The text of the monument reads:

In Mermoriam Of Him who being with Andrew Broughton joint clerk of the Court which tried and condemned Charles the First of England, had such zeal to accept the full responsibility of his act, that he signed each record with his full name John Phelps. He came to Vevey, and died like the associates whose memorials are about us, an exile in the cause of human freedom. This slab is placed at the request of William Walter Phelps of New Jersey, and Charles A. Phelps of Massachusetts, descendants from across the seas.

This article is based in part upon material originally written by Brian Phelps and licensed for use in Wikipedia under the GFDL.

Notes

References
 Adapted from "The Phelps Family of America and their English Ancestors" Judge Oliver Seymour Phelps and Andrew T. Servin (Eagle Publishing Company of Pittsfield, Massachusetts) 1899.

External links

 House of Commons Journal Volume 8, 28 May 1660 Proceedings against the Regicides

Clerks
Regicides of Charles I
English royalty
1619 births
17th-century deaths
17th-century English people